Wolfgang Hackbusch (born 24 October 1948 in Westerstede, Lower Saxony) is a German mathematician, known for his pioneering research in multigrid methods and later hierarchical matrices, a concept generalizing the fast multipole method. He was a professor at the University of Kiel and is currently one of the directors of the Max Planck Institute for Mathematics in the Sciences in Leipzig.

Awards and honors
 1994 Gottfried Wilhelm Leibniz Prize
 1996 Brouwer Medal
 1998 Plenary Speaker of the International Congress of Mathematicians

Publications
 Multi-grid methods and applications, 1985, Springer Berlin, ; 2013 pbk reprint
 Elliptic Differential Equations: Theory and Numerical Treatment, 1992, Springer Berlin, 
 Iterative Solution of Large Sparse Systems of Equations, 1993, Springer Berlin, 
 Integral Equations: Theory and Numerical Treatment, 1995, Birkhäuser, 
 Hierarchische Matrizen: Algorithmen und Analysis, 2009, Springer Berlin, 
 Tensor spaces and numerical tensor calculus, 2012, Springer, Heidelberg  
 The Concept of Stability in Numerical Mathematics, 2014, Springer, Leipzig

References

Stefan Sauter and Gabriel Wittum, On the occasion of the 60th birthday of Wolfgang Hackbusch, Computing and Visualization in Science 11(2008) 191 DOI 10.1007/s00791-008-0123-z

External links

 Wolfgang Hackbusch at the Max Planck Institute for Mathematics in the Sciences in Leipzig

1948 births
Living people
People from Ammerland
20th-century German mathematicians
Gottfried Wilhelm Leibniz Prize winners
Brouwer Medalists
21st-century German mathematicians
Max Planck Institute directors